Rūta Meilutytė (born 19 March 1997) is a Lithuanian swimmer. An Olympic gold medalist, she is a world record holder in the short course 50 metre breaststroke and 100 metre breaststroke. She is a former world record holder in the long course 50 metre breaststroke and 100 metre breaststroke.

At the age of 15, Meilutytė had already broken eleven Lithuanian women's swimming records. At the 2011 European Youth Summer Olympic Festival in Trabzon, she won the gold medal in the 100m breaststroke, a silver in the 50m freestyle and a bronze in the 100m freestyle. At the 2012 Summer Olympics in London, Meilutytė won the gold medal in the women's 100 metre breaststroke with a time of 1:05.47. At age 15, she was also the youngest Lithuanian athlete to win an Olympic gold medal.

In 2013 Meilutytė broke her own European record by 0.01 of a second. Meilutytė competed at the 2013 World Aquatics Championships in Barcelona and achieved world records in the 50 and 100 metre breaststroke.  At the age of 17 she became the first swimmer in history to win all available junior and senior international swimming championships at least once.

From July 2019 to July 2021, Meilutytė served a 24-month suspension for anti-doping rule violations between April 2018 and March 2019. She returned to national competition in December 2021.

Personal life
Meilutytė was born in Kaunas, Lithuania, on 19 March 1997, the daughter of Saulius Meilutis and Ingrida Meilutienė. Meilutytė has two older brothers, Margiris (age 26 as of 2018), who is a law student, and Mindaugas (age 30 as of 2018). Meilutytė began swimming at the age of seven. Although not particularly tall, she has had size 43 feet (EU) since she was 13 years old. Meilutytė went to Kaunas "Milikoniai" middle-school from ages 6–13.

Career

Early career
In 2011, she broke her first Lithuanian swimming record in the women's 50m and 100m breaststroke.

2012: Olympic and double World champion at 15 years of age

2012 Summer Olympics

After earning selection to compete at the 2012 Summer Olympics, Meilutytė became the youngest Lithuanian swimmer to compete at the modern Olympic Games. In her first event, the 100 metre breaststroke heats, Meilutytė placed first, with a time of 1:05.56, and broke the national Lithuanian swimming record for the 100 metre breaststroke. At the 100 metre breaststroke semi-finals, Meilutytė also placed first, by breaking her previously set Lithuanian swimming record and she also broke the women's 100 metre breaststroke European record, with a time of 1:05.21. Meilutytė also competed in the 50m freestyle, where she failed to progress to the semi-final despite winning her heat and setting a new national record of 25.55 seconds, and the 100m freestyle.

During the 41st European Olympic Committees (EOC) General Assembly, Meilutytė was named 2012 best European young athlete of the year.

2012 World Swimming Championships

At the 2012 FINA World Swimming Championships (25 m) in Istanbul, Turkey, Meilutytė competed in four events: 50 metre breaststroke, 100 metre breaststroke, 100 metre freestyle and 100 metre individual medley.

In her first event, 50 metre breaststroke heats, Meilutytė placed first, with a time of 29.56 seconds, and broke the national Lithuanian swimming record, European record and Championship record for the women's 50 metre breaststroke (short-course). In the 50 metre breaststroke semi-finals, Meilutytė also placed first, by breaking the same records again, with a time of 29.51 seconds. During the 50 metre breaststroke final, she won the gold medal, by beating Alia Atkinson (29.62) and Jessica Hardy (29.82) with a time of 29.44 seconds and for the third time broke all three records for the women's 50 metre breaststroke (short-course).

At the 100 metre freestyle, where she progressed to the semi-final by placing 5th in her heat and setting a new national record of 53.54 seconds. Due to the fact that the semi-finals of women's 100 metre freestyle were held just 19 minutes before the 50 metre breaststroke final, Meilutytė withdrew from the 100 metre freestyle semi-finals because of the schedule being too tight.

Meilutytė also competed in the 100 metre individual medley. During the 100 metre individual medley heats, Meilutytė placed second and set a new national record of 59.33 seconds. In the 100 metre individual medley semi-finals she placed third and again set a new national record of 59.15 seconds. In the final of the same event, Meilutytė won the silver medal and for the third time set a new national record of 58.79 seconds.

On the third day of the Championships, Meilutytė competed in 100 metre breaststroke heats, where she placed first and set a new national record of 1:04.69. At the 100 metre breaststroke semi-finals she placed second, with a time of 1:04.81. On 15 December, Meilutytė competed in her last event of the 2012 FINA World Swimming Championships – the 100 metre breaststroke finals, and won her second gold medal in this championship, with a time of 1:03.52, and broke the national Lithuanian swimming record, European record and Championship record (which was previously held by Rebecca Soni) for the women's 100 metre breaststroke (short-course).

During this championship, Meilutytė broke various national Lithuanian swimming records nine times, European – four times and Championship records also four times.

2013: Three world records as a 16-year-old

2013 World Aquatics championships

At the 2013 World Aquatics Championships in Barcelona, Spain, Meilutytė has competed in three events: 50 metre breaststroke, 100 metre breaststroke and 100 metre freestyle. On 29 July 2013, Meilutytė competed in her first event – the 100 metre breaststroke heats, where she placed first with a time of 1:04.52, and broke the national Lithuanian swimming record, European record and Championship record for the 100 metre breaststroke (long course). On the same day in the 100 metre breaststroke semi-finals Meilutytė broke the World record in 100 metre breaststroke, finishing with a time of 1:04.35 seconds and becoming the first record-holder of the championships and the first Lithuanian athlete to break a swimming world record since Lithuania gained independence from the Soviet Union in 1990. During the 100 metre breaststroke final, she won the gold medal, by beating Yuliya Efimova (1:05.02) and Jessica Hardy (1:05.52) with a time of 1:04.42.

Meilutytė also competed in the 100 metre freestyle, where she finished with a time of 55.72 and failed to progress to the semi-final. She also was scheduled to compete in the 50 metre freestyle, but did not start because wanted to concentrate on her next event – 50 metre breaststroke.

In 50 metre breaststroke heats, Meilutytė placed third, with a time of 30.07. On the same day, during the 50 metre breaststroke semi-finals, Meilutytė placed first, with a time of 29.48, and broke world record in 50 metre breaststroke, which was previously held by Yuliya Yefimova, who broke it in the 50 metre breaststroke heats on the same day before. On the next and the last day of the championships, Meilutytė competed in 50 metre breaststroke final, where she won the silver medal with a time of 29.59.

2013 World Junior Swimming Championships

At the 2013 FINA World Junior Swimming Championships in Dubai, United Arab Emirates, Meilutytė competed in eight events: 50 metre freestyle, 100 metre freestyle, 50 metre breaststroke, 100 metre breaststroke, 50 metre backstroke, 50 metre butterfly, 200 metre individual medley and 4×100 metre mixed medley.

In her first event, 50 metre breaststroke heats, Meilutytė qualified to the semi-final with a time of 31.10 seconds and broke Championship record. In the 50 metre breaststroke semi-finals, Meilutytė placed first, with a time of 30.04 seconds and broke 50 metre breaststroke Championship record for the second time. At the 50 metre breaststroke final, she finished first and won gold medal with a time of 29.86 seconds, beating Viktorija Solnceva (31.34) and Sophie Taylor (31.38) and for the third time breaking Championship record.

In the 100 metre breaststroke heats, Meilutyte placed second with a time of 1:08.62 seconds. At the 100 metre breaststroke semi-finals, she placed third with a time of 1:08.49 seconds. During 50 metre breaststroke final, she won gold medal, by beating Sophie Taylor (1:07.36) and Viktorija Solnceva (1:07.53) with a time of 1:06.61 seconds and broke Championship record for the girl's 100 metre breaststroke (long-course).

In 50 metre backstroke heats, Meilutytė finished seventh with a time of 29.04 seconds, broke Lithuanian swimming record for the women's 50 metre backstroke (long-course). In the 50 metre backstroke semi-finals, she finished fourth, with a time of 28.78 seconds and broke Lithuanian record for the second time. During 50 metre backstroke final, Meilutytė placed fifth with a time of 29.03 seconds.

In 50 metre freestyle heats, she finished second with a time of 25.36 seconds, while in 50 metre freestyle semi-finals, Meilutyte broke Lithuanian record and finished second with a time of 25.19 seconds. During the 50 metre freestyle final, Meilutyte won gold medal by beating Rozaliya Nasretdinova (25.16) and Siobhan Bernadette Haughey (25.38) and for the second time breaking Lithuanian swimming record for the women's 50 metre freestyle (long-course).

Meilutytė also broke Lithuanian record in 50 metre butterfly heats, where she placed fifth with a time of 27.29 seconds. During 50 metre butterfly semi-finals, she finished seventh with a time of 27.14 seconds and broke Lithuanian swimming record for the second time. Meilutytė withdrew from the 50 metre butterfly final because of the great physical load.

In the 100 metre freestyle heats, Meilutyte finished fourth with a time of 55.65 seconds. In the 100 metre freestyle semi-finals, she placed second with a time of 55.16 seconds, broke Lithuanian swimming record for the women's 100 metre freestyle (long-course). During 100 metre freestyle final, Meilutytė won silver medal, finishing behind Siobhan Bernadette Haughey (54.47) with a time of 54.94 seconds.

In 200 metre individual medley heats, Meilutytė finished first with a time of 2:15.10 seconds. During the 200 metre individual medley final, she won gold medal, by beating Emu Higuchi (2:15.15) and Ella Eastin (2:15.34) and broke Championship and Lithuanian swimming record.

Meilutyte also competed in 4×100 metre mixed medley with Danas Rapšys, Povilas Strazdas, Eva Gliožerytė. During 4×100 metre mixed medley heats, they finished third with a time of 3:55.74 seconds and qualified to the final. At the 4×100 metre mixed medley final, Meilutyte, Rapšys, Strazdas and Gliožerytė finished second and won silver medal with a time of 3:52.52 seconds.

During this Championship, Meilutytė broke various Championship records five times, Lithuanian records nine times and won six medals – gold medals for 50 metre freestyle, 50 metre breaststroke, 100 metre breaststroke and 200 metre individual medley, while for 100 metre freestyle and 4×100 metre mixed medley she won silver medals.

2013 Swimming World Cup

Meilutytė participated in one meet of 2013 FINA Swimming World Cup in Moscow, Russia. On the overall women's scoring of the 2013 FINA Swimming World Cup, she placed fourteenth with total of 80 points. At the meet in Moscow, Meilutytė competed in four events: 50 metre breaststroke, 100 metre breaststroke, 50 metre freestyle and 100 metre individual medley.

In 50 metre breaststroke heats, Meilutytė placed second with a time of 29.96 seconds. In 50 metre breaststroke final, she won gold medal, by beating Alia Atkinson (29.33) and Dorothea Brandt (30.35) with a time of 28.89 seconds and broke European swimming record for women's 50 metre breaststroke (short course) which was previously held by herself. In 100 metre breaststroke heats, Meilutytė placed third with a time of 1:06.03 seconds. In 100 metre breaststroke final, she won gold medal, by beating Yuliya Yefimova (1:03.53) and Alia Atkinson (1:04.64) with a time of 1:02.36 and set a new world swimming record for women's 100 metre breaststroke (short course).

Meilutytė also competed in 50 metre freestyle heats, where she placed tenth with a time of 25.18 seconds and did not qualify to the final. In 100 metre individual medley heats, she placed fifth with a time of 1:0.97 seconds. In 100 metre individual medley final, Meilutytė won her third gold medal at 2013 FINA Swimming World Cup, by beating Katinka Hosszú (58.75) and Alia Atkinson (59.12) with a time of 58.57 seconds. She also broke Lithuanian swimming record for women's 100 metre individual medley (short course).

2013 European Short Course Swimming Championships

At the 2013 European Short Course Swimming Championships in Herning, Denmark, Meilutytė competed three events: 50 metre breaststroke, 100 metre breaststroke and 100 metre individual medley. She won gold medals and broke Championship records for all three events.

2014

2014 Summer Youth Olympics

At the 2014 Summer Youth Olympics in Nanjing, China, Meilutytė has competed in three events: 50 metre breaststroke, 100 metre breaststroke and 100 metre freestyle.

In her first event, 50 metre breaststroke heats, Meilutytė placed third, with a time of 32.11 seconds. In the 50 metre breaststroke semi-finals, Meilutytė placed first, with a time of 31.67 seconds. During the 50 metre breaststroke final, she won the gold medal, by beating Julia Willers (31.78) and Anna Sztankovics (31.84) with a time of 30.14 seconds. At the 100 metre breaststroke heats, Meilutytė placed second, with a time of 1:08.97 seconds. At the 100 metre breaststroke semi-finals she placed first, with a time of 1:07.83. On the next day of the 2014 Summer Youth Olympics, Meilutytė competed in 100 metre breaststroke final, where she won the gold medal with a time of 1:05.39.

Meilutytė also competed in the 100 metre freestyle. During the 100 metre freestyle heats, Meilutytė placed fourth, with a time of 56.20 seconds. On the same day in the 100 metre freestyle semi-finals, where she placed fourth, with a time of 55.46 seconds. During the 100 metre freestyle final, Meilutytė placed fifth and set a new personal record of 55.17 seconds. She also was scheduled to compete in the 200 metre individual medley, but did not start due to the pain in her shoulder.

2014 European Aquatics Championships

At the 2014 European Aquatics Championships in Berlin, Germany, Meilutytė has competed in two events: 50 metre breaststroke and 50 metre freestyle. On 23 August 2014, Meilutytė competed in her first event – the 50 metre breaststroke heats, where she placed first with a time of 30.73. On the same day in the 50 metre breaststroke semi-finals Meilutytė broke the Championship record in 50 metre breaststroke, previously held by Yuliya Efimova (30.29 seconds), finishing with a time of 29.88 seconds. On 24 August 2014, Meilutytė competed in the 50 metre breaststroke final, where she won the gold medal with a time of 29.89 seconds, thus making it the last gold medal she needed to reach first ever Aquatic Grand Slam, which requires to win gold medal in swimming events at Olympic Games, Youth Olympic Games, FINA World Senior (long-course and short-course) and Junior Championships, Swimming World Cup, European Youth and Senior Championships (long-course and short-course). Meilutytė is the first Lithuanian swimmer ever to win gold medal in a long-course European Aquatics Championships.

At the 50 metre freestyle, she progressed to the semi-final by placing 17th with the time of 25.54 seconds. Meilutytė decided to withdraw from the 50 metre freestyle semi-finals because she wanted to save energy for the 50 metre breaststroke final.

2014 Swimming World Cup

Meilutytė participated in two meets of the 2014 FINA Swimming World Cup – in Singapore and Tokyo, Japan. On the overall women's scoring of the 2014 FINA Swimming World Cup, she placed thirteenth with total of 45 points.

At the meet in Tokyo, Japan, Meilutytė competed in four events: 50 metre breaststroke, 100 metre breaststroke, 50 metre freestyle, and 100 metre individual medley. In 50 metre breaststroke heats, she placed first with a time of 29.90 seconds. During the 50 metre breaststroke final, Meilutytė won gold medal, by beating Alia Atkinson (29.66) and Lillia King (30.13) with a time of 29.36 seconds. Meilutytė also competed in 100 metre breaststroke event, where she won silver medal with a time of 1:03.72 seconds.

In 100 metre individual medley heats, Meilutytė placed sixth, with a time of 1:00.33 seconds. In the 100 metre individual medley final, she placed fourth, with a time of 59.23 seconds. In 50 metre freestyle heats, Meilutytė placed twelfth, with a time of 25.15 seconds and did not qualify to the final. Meilutytė was also scheduled to compete in 100 metre freestyle, but decided to withdraw because she wanted to prepare for the 50 metre breaststroke event.

At the 2014 FINA Swimming World Cup meet in Singapore, Meilutytė competed in three events: 100 metre breaststroke, 50 metre freestyle and 100 metre individual medley. In 50 metre breaststroke heats, she placed second with a time of 30.09 seconds. In the 50 metre breaststroke final, she won a silver medal with a time of 29.26 seconds. Meilutytė also competed in the 100 metre breaststroke event. In 100 metre breaststroke heats, she finished first, beating Alia Atkinson (1:05.16) and Katie Meili (1:07.07) with a time of 1:04.89. In the 100 metre breaststroke final, Meilutytė won a silver medal with a time of 1:03.05 seconds.

In 50 metre freestyle heats, Meilutytė placed tenth with a time of 25.60 seconds and did not qualify to the final. In 100 metre individual medley heats, Meilutytė placed fourth with a time of 1:00.32 seconds. In the final, she won a bronze medal with a time of 59.00 seconds.

2014 World Swimming Championships

At the 2014 FINA World Swimming Championships (25 m) in Doha, Qatar, Meilutytė competed in four events: 50 metre breaststroke, 100 metre breaststroke, 100 metre freestyle and 100 metre individual medley.

2015

2015 World Aquatics championships

At the 2015 World Aquatics Championships in Kazan, Russia, Meilutytė competed in two events: 50 metre breaststroke and 100 metre breaststroke.

Short hiatus
In September 2015 Meilutytė suffered an injury to her elbow while riding a bike from her home at Plymouth to her training camp. She had to undergo a small surgery, which was done by surgeon Andre Murphy. Because of this, Meilutytė had to take a break from her everyday swimming for a few weeks and then undergo rehabilitation. Because of the accident, she did not participate at the 2015 European Short Course Swimming Championships in Netanya, Israel.

2016

2016 Summer Olympics
At the 2016 Summer Olympics in Rio de Janeiro, Meilutytė finished seventh in the 100 metre breaststroke.

2017

2017 World Aquatics championships

At the 2017 World Aquatics Championships in Budapest, Hungary, Meilutytė has competed in three events: 100 metre breaststroke, 50 metre breaststroke and 50 metre freestyle.

On 24 July 2017, Meilutytė competed in her first event – the 100 metre breaststroke heats, where she placed third with a time of 1:05.81. On the same day, during semi-finals Meilutytė also placed third, put up a 1:05.06, marking her fastest performance in this event since she 2013. Meilutytė finished fourth in the 100 metre breaststroke final with a 1:05.65. She was well off her previous World Record time of 1:04.35, which was broken by Lilly King, who swam a 1:04.13.

Meilutytė also competed in the 50 metre freestyle heats, where she finished with a time of 26.03 and failed to progress to the semi-final.

In 50 metre breaststroke heats, Meilutytė placed sixth, with a time of 30.58, to secure her spot for the semi-finals. On the evening session, she placed fourth with a time of 30.40 seconds. Meilutytė managed to finish in fourth place on the final round by twenty-one hundredths of a second (0.21) behind American Katie Meili, clocking at 30.20. Russian Yuliya Yefimova placed second and Meili's teammate Lilly King broke another World Record with a time of 29.40.

2018

2018 European Aquatics Championships

At the 2018 European Aquatics Championships in Glasgow, United Kingdom, Meilutytė competed in the 50 metre freestyle, 100 metre breaststroke, Mixed 4 × 100 metre medley relay and 50 metre breaststroke. On 3 August 2018, Meilutytė competed in her first event – the 50 metre freestyle heats, where she placed tenth with a time of 25.20. On the same day in the 50 metre freestyle semi-finals Meilutytė broke her own national record (25.10 seconds), finishing with a time of 25.04 seconds. During the 50 metre freestyle final, Meilutytė placed eighth with a time of 25.16.
At the 100 metre breaststroke heats, Meilutytė placed first, with a time of 1:06.89 seconds. At the 100 metre breaststroke semi-finals she placed fifth, with a time of 1:07.16. On the next day of the 2018 European Aquatics Championships, Meilutytė competed in 100 metre breaststroke final, where she won the silver medal with a time of 1:06.26.

2019–2021: Suspension and return

Suspension due to anti-doping rule violations
In early May 2019, Meilutytė was facing at least a one-year suspension for not being present for doping tests in April 2018, August 2018, and March 2019. On 21 May 2019, Meilutytė announced her retirement from sports. Five days later, Swimming World officially called her career as permanently over, with no prospects of ever returning to competition, and dubbed her actions the "Fall of an Olympic Champion". Four days earlier, NBC Sports propagated the same sentiment, including that she was a "shock Olympic swimming champion". On 21 July 2019, Meilutytė was officially suspended from swimming competition by FINA from 21 July 2019 to 20 July 2021 due to her three anti-doping rule violations of not being present for testing.

Return to competition
Returning to competition following the two year suspension, Meilutytė competed at the 2021 Lithuanian Short Course Championships in Klaipėda in December in the 100 metre breaststroke, where she won the gold medal with a time of 1:05.23, the 50 metre butterfly, where she won the silver medal with a 26.69, and the 50 metre breaststroke, in which she won the gold medal in 29.33 seconds.

2022: World and European champion in 50 metre breaststroke

2022 World Aquatics Championships
In 2022, Meilutytė returned to training, attending a training camp with the Lithuania National Team from January to February. At the long course 2022 Winter Lithuanian Championships, she won the gold medal in the 50 metre breaststroke with a 30.24 and the gold medal in the 50 metre freestyle in a time of 25.19 seconds. Two months later, she achieved a 2022 World Aquatics Championships qualifying time in the 100 metre breaststroke, finishing in 1:07.07 in a silver medal-winning performance at the 2022 Lithuanian Swimming Championships. At the 2022 World Aquatics Championships she won the bronze medal in the women's 100 metre breaststroke, finishing behind Anna Elendt (1:05.98) and Benedetta Pilato (1:05.93) with a time of 1:06.02. On July 25, ten years after winning Olympic gold and nine years after her last world championship win, Meilutytė won a second world title, taking out the 50m breaststroke in Budapest.

2022 European Aquatics Championships
For her first event at the 2022 European Aquatics Championships, held in August in Rome, Italy, Meilutytė won the bronze medal in the 100 metre breaststroke with a time of 1:06.50, which was 0.53 seconds slower than gold medalist Benedetta Pilato and 0.16 seconds behind silver medalist Lisa Angiolini of Italy. In her second event, the 50 metre freestyle, she placed thirty-first in the preliminary heats with a time of 26.38 seconds and did not advance to the semifinals stage of competition. On 17 August, the seventh day of competition, she won the European title and gold medal in the 50 metre breaststroke, finishing over one-tenth of a second ahead of the next-fastest swimmer with a time of 29.59 seconds.

2022 Swimming World Cup
On 23 October, at the 2022 FINA Swimming World Cup stop in Berlin, Germany, Meilutytė won the gold medal and set a new European record and Lithuanian record in the short course 50 metre breaststroke with a time of 28.60 seconds, which was just four-hundredths of a second slower than the world record of 28.56 seconds by Alia Atkinson in 2018. In addition to her gold medal in the 50 metre breaststroke, she won the gold medal in the 100 metre breaststroke with a time of 1:03.07 and placed fifth in the 100 metre individual medley with a time of 59.08 seconds over the full three days in Berlin.

The following stop of the circuit, in Toronto, Canada beginning 28 October, Meilutytė started off with a seventh-place finish in the final of the 100 metre individual medley on day one with a time of 59.67 seconds. On the second day, she won the gold medal in the 100 metre breaststroke with a time of 1:02.95, which made her the only female to swim faster than 1:03.00 in the final. In the morning preliminaries she had finished in a time of 1:04.74 to qualify for the final ranking fourth, just 0.04 seconds behind third-ranked Lydia Jacoby of the United States and 0.20 seconds behind first-ranked Anna Elendt. The next day, she was the only female to swim faster than 29.00 seconds in the 50 metre breaststroke, winning the gold medal with a time of 28.96 seconds, which was 1.29 seconds faster than bronze medalist Anastasia Gorbenko of Israel.

In the 100 metre individual medley on day one of the stop in the third and final location, Indianapolis, United States, Meilutytė placed seventh with a time of 59.58 seconds. She followed up with a gold medal-win in the 100 metre breaststroke on day two, finishing 0.97 seconds ahead of the second-place finisher with a US Open record time of 1:02.77. She made it another gold medal in a US Open record time the following day, winning the 50 metre breaststroke with a time of 28.70 seconds. Across all three stops of the World Cup, she earned 151.9 points for her performances, ranking as the fifth overall highest-scoring female competitor.

2022 World Short Course Championships
At the 2022 World Short Course Championships, held in Melbourne, Australia, Meilutytė ranked first in the preliminaries of the 100 metre breaststroke on day two with a time of 1:03.81 and qualified for the evening semifinals. She finished in 1:03.40 in the semifinals to qualify for the final ranking second. During racing in the final the following day, she was disqualified. Beginning again, this time in the preliminaries of the 50 metre breaststroke on day five, she qualified for the semifinals ranked first with a time of 29.10 seconds. In the semifinals, she set the first world record of the Championships in a stage other than an event final, achieving a new world record time of 28.37 seconds. She won the gold medal in the final with a time of 28.50 seconds, which made her the world title holder in the female 50 metre breaststroke for both the long course and short course World Championships in 2022.

Personal bests

Records
Legend: records marked bold are still held by Rūta Meilutytė.

European records

World records

International championships (50 m)

International championships (25 m)

Decorations
  Grand Cross of Order for Merits to Lithuania (10 August 2012)

See also
List of Olympic medalists in swimming (women)
List of Youth Olympic Games gold medalists who won Olympic gold medals
List of World Aquatics Championships medalists in swimming (women)
List of World Swimming Championships (25 m) medalists (women)
List of Lithuanian records in swimming
List of Baltic records in swimming
List of European records in swimming
List of world records in swimming
World record progression 50 metres breaststroke
World record progression 100 metres breaststroke

References

External links

1997 births
Living people
European Aquatics Championships medalists in swimming
Lithuanian female breaststroke swimmers
Lithuanian female freestyle swimmers
Lithuanian female medley swimmers
Lithuanian Sportsperson of the Year winners
Medalists at the 2012 Summer Olympics
Medalists at the FINA World Swimming Championships (25 m)
Olympic gold medalists for Lithuania
Olympic gold medalists in swimming
Olympic swimmers of Lithuania
People educated at Plymouth College
Sportspeople from Kaunas
Swimmers at the 2012 Summer Olympics
Swimmers at the 2016 Summer Olympics
Swimmers at the 2014 Summer Youth Olympics
World Aquatics Championships medalists in swimming
World record holders in swimming
Youth Olympic gold medalists for Lithuania